Omar Higinio García (born 11 September 1939) is an Argentine footballer. He played in three matches for the Argentina national football team in 1959. He was also part of Argentina's squad for the 1959 South American Championship that took place in Ecuador.

References

1939 births
Living people
Argentine footballers
Argentina international footballers
Place of birth missing (living people)
Association footballers not categorized by position